

Mogi may refer to:

People
Hiroto Mogi, Japanese footballer
Ken Mogi, Japanese brain scientist
Kiyoo Mogi, Japanese seismologist
Shigeru Mogi, Japanese voice actor
Yasuko Mogi, Japanese female mixed martial arts (MMA) fighter
Yuzaburo Mogi, Japanese business executive

Places

Brazil
Mogi das Cruzes, a municipality in the state of São Paulo
Mogi Guaçu, a municipality in the state of São Paulo
Mogi Mirim, a municipality in the state of São Paulo

Japan
Mogi Station, a railway station in Kōriyama, Fukushima